Martin Ndubuisi Ifedi (born September 4, 1991) is a former American football defensive end. He played college football at Memphis.

Professional career

St. Louis Rams
Ifedi was drafted in the seventh round, 227th overall, by the Rams in the 2015 NFL Draft. He was released by the team on September 5, 2015.

Tampa Bay Buccaneers
On November 10, 2015, Ifedi was signed to the Buccaneers' practice squad. He was released on May 10, 2016, but was re-signed August 5, 2016. On August 28, 2016, he was waived by the Buccaneers.

Atlanta Falcons
On December 27, 2016, Ifedi was signed to the Falcons' practice squad. He signed a reserve/future contract with the Falcons on February 7, 2017. On April 30, 2017, he was waived by the Falcons. He re-signed with the Falcons on June 13, 2017. He was waived/injured on September 2, 2017, and placed on injured reserve. Ifedi was waived on April 10, 2018.

Memphis Express
In 2018, Ifedi signed with the Memphis Express of the Alliance of American Football for the 2019 season. However, he was placed on injured reserve before the start of the regular season, and waived on March 4, 2019. He was added to the team's rights list and re-signed to a contract on March 19. He was activated to the team's roster on March 20. He was placed on injured reserve on April 1. The league ceased operations in April 2019.

Seattle Dragons
In October 2019, Ifedi was picked up by the Seattle Dragons during the 2020 XFL Draft's open phase. He signed a contract with the team on January 8, 2020. He was waived during final roster cuts on January 22, 2020. He was signed to the XFL's practice squad team, referred to as Team 9, on January 30, 2020. Ifedi was re-signed by the Dragons on March 9, 2020. He had his contract terminated when the league suspended operations on April 10, 2020.

Personal life
Ifedi is also a member of the Kappa Eta (ΚΗ) chapter of Alpha Phi Alpha fraternity. His younger brother, Germain, played for the Atlanta Falcons & Chicago Bears.

References

External links
 Memphis Tigers bio

1991 births
Living people
American football offensive tackles
American football defensive linemen
Memphis Tigers football players
Players of American football from Houston
St. Louis Rams players
Tampa Bay Buccaneers players
Atlanta Falcons players
Memphis Express (American football) players
Seattle Dragons players
Team 9 players